Amen Corner may refer to:

Places
Amen Corner (niche), Fifth Avenue Hotel (1859-1908), New York City
Amen Corner, London, street in the centre of London, England, near St Paul's Cathedral
Amen Corner, area and road junction in Tooting, South London between Mitcham Road, Rectory Lane, and Southcroft Road
Amen Corner, Berkshire, a suburb of Bracknell, Berkshire, England
Amen Corner, a thoroughfare in Caunton, near Newark-on-Trent, Nottinghamshire, England
Amen Corner, a thoroughfare in central Rotherham, South Yorkshire, England
Amen Corner, on which St Nicholas' Cathedral, Newcastle upon Tyne, England, is situated
Amen Corner, a crossroads in Gussage All Saints, Dorset, England

Arts and media
Amen Corner (band), 1960s British pop group
Amen Corner (musical), 1983 musical
Amen Corner (novel), novel by Rick Shefchik
The Amen Corner, 1954 play by James Baldwin
"The Amen Corner", song from the 1998 album My Arms, Your Hearse by Swedish progressive metal group Opeth
Amen Corner, a 2008 album by Railroad Earth

Other uses
Amen Corner (golf), nickname of the 11th, 12th, and 13th water holes at Augusta National Golf Club

See also
 "Trouble in the Amen Corner", a poem and song